Spencer Antle (born March 7, 1969) is an American fashion designer, film director and rum curator. He is also the founder of the Island Company lifestyle clothing brand and Island Company Rum. He is the CEO, Creative Director of the firm, and also its designer, photographer and advertiser.

He started his career in Los Angeles as a screenwriter and  television commercial director, and has won multiple awards for his commercials.

Early life
Born in Hawaii as his father was serving on a US Navy submarine,  Antle was schooled in prep schools in the United Kingdom, high school in Wayland, Massachusetts and studied creative writing at University of Miami. He started a career in Los Angeles as a screenwriter and television commercial director, winning multiple Telly Awards, Association of Independent Commercial Producers awards, CINE Eagle Awards, ADDY Awards for various commercials. He  is a member of the Directors Guild of America.

Island Company

Antle started the lifestyle brand Island Company out of his car selling bikinis store-to-store across the United States. The firm is a supplier of high-end apparel to the resort destination market and has been named Inc. Top 500/5000 Fastest Growing Companies six years in a row since 2008.

Antle opened the first of multiple retail locations across the glove in 2008 during the Great Recession. He opened and designed Island Company stores in Nantucket, Naples Florida, Palm Beach, FL, Grand Cayman, Harbour Island, Bahamas, Martha’s Vineyard, a concept store inside the Ritz Carlton Ft Lauderdale, East Hampton, NY,

In March, 2013 he launched Island Company's first concept store, Escape Travel Live at Atlantis Paradise Island, Bahamas. That same month he won the 2012-2013 "Best Of Broadcast" ADDY Awards for his film direction of his firm's commercial, "Never Return".

In April, 2013 Antle was awarded the "Entrepreneurial Spirit" Award from the Palm Beach Chamber Of Commerce for his work in bringing his firm's store to Palm Beach and Worth Avenue.

Cayman Islands Olympic Team Outfits 
In 2016, Antle designed the outfits worn by the Cayman Islands Olympic team in the 2016 Summer Olympics in Rio De Janeiro Brazil. The outfits were named as the best designs of the 2016 Olympics.

Quit Your Job Mantra 
Antle wrote the mantra ‘Quit Your Job, Buy A Ticket, Get A Tan, Fall In Love, Never Return”. The phrase has been the subject of many lawsuits involving trademark infringement. Lawsuits were filed against Abercrombie & Fitch, Cotton On, Free People, PacSun, Kendall Jenner and Kylie Jenner and multiple retailers who were forced to cease their infringement on Antle’s writings.

Island Company Rum 
Antle created Island Company Rum, launched it in 2018, and serves as its current CEO and Creative Director. Antle set out to design “the smoothest rum on the planet”.

The rum has won numerous awards including Double Gold at The SIP Awards, Best Gold Rum at Caribbean Journal, Best Gold Rum at San Francisco World Spirits Competition, Best Light Rum at World Spirits Awards, Best Rum at New York International Spirits Competition, Best Gold Rum at the Caribbean Rum Awards and many more.

References

External links

Island Company Rum

University of Miami alumni
1971 births
Living people
American fashion designers